Batur is a surname. Notable people with the surname include:

Emre Batur, Turkish volleyball player
Enis Batur, Turkish writer
Erdeni Batur, Mongolian monarch
Gheni Batur, Uyghur national hero
Ivan Batur, Croatian Basketball player

See also
Ospan Batyr, Kazakh fighter

Turkish-language surnames